During the 1988–89 English football season, AFC Bournemouth competed in the Football League Second Division.

Final league table

Results
Bournemouth's score comes first

Legend

Football League Second Division

FA Cup

League Cup

Full Members' Cup

Squad

References

AFC Bournemouth seasons
AFC Bournemouth